Lake Çöl (literally "Desert lake") is a hard water lake in Turkey.

Location
It is situated in a closed basin and fed by a few small creeks. It is a shallow lake and the surface area fluctuates.

Fauna
The lake is the home or breeding area of many birds.  Kentish plover, 	lesser short-toed lark, lesser kestrel, crane, 	gull-billed tern  and great bustard are among the common birds of the lake . According to pre-1990 figures the number of birds of the lake exceeds 76,000.It has been speculated that the short wave transmitter station of Turkish Radio and Television Corporation which is situated north of the lake may reduce this number.   Small skipper is the common butterfly around the lake area.

Economy of the area
The area around the lake is salty. There are steps to the north of the lake and agricultural lands further to the north. The main products are cereal. In the plains around the lake, bovine and, in the hills, sheep are the common livestock.

References

Col
Landforms of Ankara Province
Balâ, Ankara
Haymana, Ankara
Important Bird Areas of Turkey